The men's road race at the 1970 UCI Road World Championships was the 37th edition of the event. The race took place on Sunday 16 August 1970 in Leicester, England. The race was won by Jean-Pierre Monseré of Belgium.

Final classification

References

Men's Road Race
UCI Road World Championships – Men's road race
1970 Super Prestige Pernod